A colloid mill is a machine that is used to reduce the particle size of a solid in suspension in a liquid, or to reduce the droplet size in emulsions.  Colloid mills work on the rotor-stator principle: a rotor turns at high speeds (2000 - 18000 RPM).  A high level of  stress is applied on the fluid which results in disrupting and breaking down the  structure. Colloid mills are frequently used to increase the stability of suspensions and emulsions, but can also be used to reduce the particle size of solids in suspensions. Higher shear rates lead to smaller droplets, down to approximately 1 μm which are more resistant to emulsion separation.

Application suitability 
Colloid mills are used in the following industries:
 Pharmaceutical
 Cosmetic
 Paint
 Soap
 Textile
 Paper
 Food
Grease

Rotor - stator construction 
A colloidal mill consist of a high speed rotor and stator with a conical milling surfaces

 1 stage toothed
 3 stage toothed

Execution 

 fix gap 
 adjustable gap

References

See also
Homogenization (chemistry)

Chemical equipment